Sewing is the craft of fastening or attaching objects using stitches made with a sewing needle and thread. Sewing is one of the oldest of the textile arts, arising in the Paleolithic era. Before the invention of spinning yarn or weaving fabric, archaeologists believe Stone Age people across Europe and Asia sewed fur and leather clothing using bone, antler or ivory sewing-needles and "thread" made of various animal body parts including sinew, catgut, and veins.

For thousands of years, all sewing was done by hand.  The invention of the sewing machine in the 19th century and the rise of computerization in the 20th century led to mass production and export of sewn objects, but hand sewing is still practiced around the world. Fine hand sewing is a characteristic of high-quality tailoring, haute couture fashion, and custom dressmaking, and is pursued by both textile artists and hobbyists as a means of creative expression.

The first known use of the word "sewing" was in the 14th century.

History

Origins

Sewing has an ancient history estimated to begin during the Paleolithic Era. Sewing was used to stitch together animal hides for clothing and for shelter. The Inuit, for example, used sinew from caribou for thread and needles made of bone; the indigenous peoples of the American Plains and Canadian Prairies used sophisticated sewing methods to assemble tipi shelters. Sewing was combined with the weaving of plant leaves in Africa to create baskets, such as those made by Zulu weavers, who used thin strips of palm leaf as "thread" to stitch wider strips of palm leaf that had been woven into a coil. The weaving of cloth from natural fibers originated in the Middle East around 4000 BC, and perhaps earlier during the Neolithic Age, and the sewing of cloth accompanied this development.

During the Middle Ages, Europeans who could afford it employed seamstresses and tailors. The vital importance of sewing was indicated by the honorific position of "Lord Sewer" at many European coronations from the Middle Ages. An example was Robert Radcliffe, 1st Earl of Sussex who was appointed Lord Sewer at the coronation of Henry VIII of England in 1509. Sewing for the most part was a woman's occupation, and most sewing before the 19th century was practical. Clothing was an expensive investment for most people, and women had an important role in extending the longevity of items of clothing. Sewing was used for mending. Clothing that was faded would be turned inside-out so that it could continue to be worn, and sometimes had to be taken apart and reassembled to suit this purpose. Once clothing became worn or torn, it would be taken apart and the reusable cloth sewn together into new items of clothing, made into quilts, or otherwise put to practical use. The many steps involved in making clothing from scratch (weaving, pattern making, cutting, alterations, and so forth) meant that women often bartered their expertise in a particular skill with one another. Decorative needlework such as embroidery was a valued skill, and young women with the time and means would practice to build their skill in this area. From the Middle Ages to the 17th century, sewing tools such as needles, pins and pincushions were included in the trousseaus of many European brides. Sewing birds or sewing clamps were used as a third hand and were popular gifts for seamstresses in the 19th century. 

Decorative embroidery was valued in many cultures worldwide. Although most embroidery stitches in the Western repertoire are traditionally British, Irish or Western European in origin, stitches originating in different cultures are known throughout the world today. Some examples are the Cretan Open Filling stitch, Romanian Couching or Oriental Couching, and the Japanese stitch. The stitches associated with embroidery spread by way of the trade routes that were active during the Middle Ages. The Silk Road brought Chinese embroidery techniques to Western Asia and Eastern Europe, while techniques originating in the Middle East spread to Southern and Western Europe through Morocco and Spain. European imperial settlements also spread embroidery and sewing techniques worldwide. However, there are instances of sewing techniques indigenous to cultures in distant locations from one another, where cross-cultural communication would have been historically unlikely. For example, a method of reverse appliqué known to areas of South America is also known to Southeast Asia.

Industrial Revolution

The Industrial Revolution shifted the production of textiles from the household to the mills. In the early decades of the Industrial Revolution, the machinery produced whole cloth. The world's first sewing machine was patented in 1790 by Thomas Saint. By the early 1840s, other early sewing machines began to appear. Barthélemy Thimonnier introduced a simple sewing machine in 1841 to produce military uniforms for France's army; shortly afterward, a mob of tailors broke into Thimonnier's shop and threw the machines out of the windows, believing the machines would put them out of work. By the 1850s, Isaac Singer developed the first sewing machines that could operate quickly and accurately and surpass the productivity of a seamstress or tailor sewing by hand.

While much clothing was still produced at home by female members of the family, more and more ready-made clothes for the middle classes were being produced with sewing machines. Textile sweatshops full of poorly paid sewing machine operators grew into entire business districts in large cities like London and New York City. To further support the industry, piece work was done for little money by women living in slums. Needlework was one of the few occupations considered acceptable for women, but it did not pay a living wage. Women doing remote work often worked 14-hour days to earn enough to support themselves, sometimes by renting sewing machines that they could not afford to buy.

Tailors became associated with higher-end clothing during this period. In London, this status grew out of the dandy trend of the early 19th century, when new tailor shops were established around Savile Row. These shops acquired a reputation for sewing high-quality handmade clothing in the style of the latest British fashions, as well as more classic styles. The boutique culture of Carnaby Street was absorbed by Savile Row tailors during the late 20th century, ensuring the continued flourishing of Savile Row's businesses.

20th century onward

Sewing underwent further developments during the 20th century. As sewing machines became more affordable to the working class, demand for sewing patterns grew. Women had become accustomed to seeing the latest fashions in periodicals during the late 19th and early 20th centuries, increasing demand for sewing patterns yet more. American tailor and manufacturer Ebenezer Butterick met the demand with paper patterns that could be traced and used by home sewers. The patterns, sold in small packets, became wildly popular. Several pattern companies soon established themselves. Women's magazines also carried sewing patterns, and continued to do so for much of the 20th century. This practice declined during the later decades of the 20th century, when ready-made clothing became a necessity as women joined the paid workforce in larger numbers, leaving them with less time to sew, if indeed they had an interest. Today, the low price of ready-made clothing in shops means that home sewing is confined largely to hobbyists in Western countries, with the exception of cottage industries in custom dressmaking and upholstery. Sewing as a pleasurable hobby has gained popularity as attested by the BBC televisions show The Great British Sewing Bee, on air since 2013.

The spread of sewing machine technology to industrialized economies around the world meant the spread of Western-style sewing methods and clothing styles as well. In Japan, traditional clothing was sewn together with running stitch that could be removed so that the clothing could be taken apart and the assorted pieces laundered separately. The tight-locked stitches made by home sewing machines, and the use of Western clothing patterns, led to a movement towards wearing Western-style clothing during the early 20th century. Western sewing and clothing styles were disseminated in sub-Saharan Africa by Christian missionaries from the 1830s onward. Indigenous cultures, such as the Zulu and Tswana, were indoctrinated in the Western way of dress as a sign of conversion to Christianity. First Western hand sewing techniques, and later machine sewing, spread throughout the regions where the European colonists settled. However, a recent examination of new online learning methods demonstrated that technology can be adapted to share knowledge of a culture's traditional sewing methods. Using self-paced online tutorials, a Malay sewing class learned how to tailor and sew a traditional men's Baju Kurung garment in 3 days, whereas a traditional Malay sewing class would have taken 5 days to teach the same information.

Advances in industrial technology, such as the development of synthetic fibres during the early 20th century, have brought profound changes to the textile industry as a whole. Textile industries in Western countries have declined sharply as textile companies compete for cheaper labour in other parts of the world. According to the U.S. Department of Labor "employment of sewers and tailors is expected to experience little or no change, growing 1 percent from 2010 to 2020". It is estimated that every lost textile job in a Western country in recent years has resulted in 1.5 jobs being created in an outsourced country such as China. Textile workers who perform tasks with sewing machines, or do detailed work by hand, are still a vital component of the industry, however. Small-scale sewing is also an economic standby in many developing countries, where many people, both male and female, are self-employed sewers.

Garment construction

Patterns and fitting
Garment construction is usually guided by a sewing pattern. A pattern can be quite simple; some patterns are nothing more than a mathematical formula that the sewer calculates based on the intended wearer's measurements. Once calculated, the sewer has the measurements needed to cut the cloth and sew the garment together. At the other end of the spectrum are haute couture fashion designs. When a couture garment is made of unusual material, or has extreme proportions, the design may challenge the sewer's engineering knowledge. Complex designs are drafted and refitted dozens of times, may take around 40 hours to develop a final pattern, and require 60 hours of cutting and sewing. It is important for a pattern to be created well because the way a completed piece fits is the reason it will either be worn or not.

Most clothing today is mass-produced, and conforms to standard sizing, based on body measurements that are intended to fit the greatest proportion of the population. However, while "standard" sizing is generally a useful guideline, it is little more than that, because there is no industry standard that is "both widely accepted and strictly adhered to in all markets".

Home sewers often work from sewing patterns purchased from companies such as Simplicity, Butterick, McCall's, Vogue, and many others. Such patterns are typically printed on large pieces of tissue paper; a sewer may simply cut out the required pattern pieces for use but may choose to transfer the pattern onto a thicker paper if repeated use is desired. A sewer may choose to alter a pattern to make it more accurately fit the intended wearer. Patterns may be changed to increase or decrease length; to add or remove fullness; to adjust the position of the waistline, shoulder line, or any other seam, or a variety of other adjustments. Volume can be added with elements such as pleats, or reduced with the use of darts. Before work is started on the final garment, test garments may be made, sometimes referred to as muslins.

Tools
Sewers working on a simple project need only a few sewing tools, such as measuring tape, needle, thread, cloth, and sewing shears. More complex projects may only need a few more simple tools to get the job done, but there are an ever-growing variety of helpful sewing aids available.

In addition to sewing shears, rotary cutters may be used for cutting fabric, usually used with a cutting mat to protect other surfaces from being damaged. Seam rippers are used to remove mistaken stitches. Special marking pens and chalk are used to mark the fabric as a guide to construction.

Pressing and ironing are an essential part of many sewing projects, and require additional tools. A steam iron is used to press seams and garments, and a variety of pressing aids such as a seam roll or tailor's ham are used to aid in shaping a garment. A pressing cloth may be used to protect the fabric from damage.

Sewing machines are now made for a broad range of specialised sewing purposes, such as quilting machines, heavy-duty machines for sewing thicker fabrics (such as leather), computerized machines for embroidery, and sergers for finishing raw edges of fabric.

A wide variety of presser foot attachments are available for many sewing machines—feet exist to help with hemming, pintucks, attaching cording, assembling patchwork, quilting, and a variety of other functions.

A thimble is a small hard tool used as a protective device for sewing.

Elements

Seamstresses are provided with the pattern, while tailors would draft their own pattern, both with the intent of using as little fabric as possible. Patterns will specify whether to cut on the grain or the bias to manipulate fabric stretch. Special placement may be required for directional, striped, or plaid fabrics.

Supporting materials, such as interfacing, interlining, or lining, may be used in garment construction, to give the fabric a more rigid or durable shape.

Before or after the pattern pieces are cut, it is often necessary to mark the pieces to provide a guide during the sewing process. Marking methods may include using pens, pencils, or chalk, tailor's tacks, snips, pins, or thread tracing, among others.

In addition to the normal lockstitch, construction stitches include edgestitching, understitching, staystitching and topstitching. Seam types include the plain seam, zigzag seam, flat fell seam, French seam and many others.

Software

With the development of cloth simulation software such as CLO3D, Marvelous Designer and Optitex, seamsters can now draft patterns on the computer and visualize clothing designs by using the pattern creation tools and virtual sewing machines within these cloth simulation programs.

In non-human animals

Tailorbirds (genus Orthotomus), such as the common tailorbird, exhibit sewing behaviour, as do some birds of related genera. They are capable of stitching together the edges of leaves, using plant fibres or spider silk as thread, in order to create cavities in which to build their nests.

See also
 Embroidery stitch
 Glossary of sewing terminology
 Glossary of textile manufacturing
 List of sewing occupations
 List of sewing stitches
 Needlework
 Notions
Patchwork
 Pattern
 Sewing machine
 Quilting

Notes

References

 
 
 
 
 
 
 
 Singer: The New Sewing Essentials by The Editors of Creative Publishing International 
 Oldest ever piece of string was made by Neanderthals 50,000 years ago https://www.newscientist.com/article/2240117-oldest-ever-piece-of-string-was-made-by-neanderthals-50000-years-ago/

External links

Spoken version of this article by Eva Longoria on Glamour Magazine website, retrieved 27 February 2016

 
Manufacturing
Crafts
Handicrafts
Home economics
Articles containing video clips